The Halberstadt CL.II was a German two-seat escort fighter/ground attack aircraft of World War I. It served in large numbers with the German Luftstreitkräfte (Imperial German Army Air Service) in 1917-18.

Development and design
Early in 1917, Idflieg, the German Army Inspectorate of Flying Troops, developed a requirement for a new type of two-seat aircraft, smaller than the existing C-type aircraft. This type, to be known as CL-type (Light C type) aircraft, were to be used to equip Schutzstaffeln (Protection flights) to escort reconnaissance aircraft. To meet this requirement, Halberstadt developed an aircraft based on its earlier, unsuccessful Halberstadt D.IV single-seat fighter. Originally designated the Halberstadt C.II, it was redesignated the Halberstadt CL.II when the CL designation was applied.

The CL.II was a single-engined biplane, with an all-wooden structure. The fuselage was covered with thin plywood panelling and housed the crew of two in a single cockpit, with the observer's 7.92 mm (.312 in) machine gun being mounted on an elevated gun ring, giving a good field of fire, allowing downwards fire at targets on the ground. A tray large enough to hold ten stick grenades was attached to the left side of the fuselage. The single-bay wings were fabric-covered, with a swept upper wing.

The aircraft had provisions for a wireless radio. When needed the radio and antenna could be installed in the observer's cockpit and a generator, that would also supply current for heated flight suits, could easily be installed. The generator was directly driven by a pulley on the engine and mounted on the left side with a tear drop shaped fairing covering it. With the generator removed, a flat panel would be fitted instead.

  
The CL.II passed its Typenprüfung (type-test) on 7 May 1917, which resulted in production orders being placed. Halberstadt built 700 CL.IIs by the time production shifted to the improved CL.IV in mid-1918. A further 200 CL.II aircraft were built in 1918 by the Bayerische Flugzeug-Werke (BFW).

Operational history
The CL.II entered service in August 1917, and proved extremely successful, its excellent manoeuvrability, rate of climb and good field of fire for its armament allowing it to match opposing single-seat fighters. It also proved to be well suited to close-support, which became the primary role of the CL-type aircraft, the units operating them being re-designated Schlachtstaffeln (Battle flights).

Ground support by the Schlachtstaffeln proved very effective, being used both in support of German attacks and to disrupt enemy attacks. An early example of the successful use of CL type aircraft in the ground attack role was during the German counterattack on 30 November 1917 during the Battle of Cambrai, where they were a major factor in the German performance.

The success of the German tactics at Cambrai, including the use of close air support, resulted in the Germans assembling large numbers of CL-types in support of the Spring Offensive in March 1918, with 38 Schlachtstaffeln (equipped with the CL.II, CL.IV and the Hannover CL.III) available, of which 27 were deployed against the British forces during the initial attack Operation Michael  The CL.II continued in service until the end of the War.

Survivors
The only existing Halberstadt CL.II is exhibited in the Polish Aviation Museum in Kraków. This unique plane served as the personal aircraft of the Commander of Luftstreitkräfte general Ernst von Hoeppner.

Variants
CL.II
Main production type, powered by Mercedes D.III engine of 110 kW (150 hp).
CL.IIa
CL.II fitted with BMW IIIa engine. Few produced for evaluation purposes.

Operators

Luftstreitkräfte
 (postwar)
Lithuanian Air Force
 (postwar)
Polskie Siły Powietrzne

Specifications (CL.II)

See also

References

Notes

Bibliography
Angelucci, Enzo (ed.). World Encyclopedia of Military Aircraft. London: Jane's, 1981. .
Gray, Peter and Thetford, Owen. German Aircraft of the First World War. London: Putnam, 1962.
Green, William and Swanborough, Gordon. The Complete Book of Fighters. New York: Smithmark, 1994. .

External links

Halberstadt CL-II Spartacus Educational
German Two Seaters

1910s German attack aircraft
1910s German fighter aircraft
CL.II
Military aircraft of World War I
Single-engined tractor aircraft
Biplanes
Aircraft first flown in 1917